The 1984–85 NBA season was the Mavericks' 5th season in the NBA.

For the second consecutive time in its young history, the Mavericks reached the playoffs. However, this time, they did not make it out of the first round, losing to the Portland Trail Blazers in five games.

Draft picks

Roster

Regular season

Season standings

z - clinched division title
y - clinched division title
x - clinched playoff spot

Record vs. opponents

Game log

|- align="center" bgcolor="#ffcccc"
| 1
| October 27, 1984
| Houston
| L 111–121
|
|
|
| Reunion Arena
| 0–1
|- align="center" bgcolor="#ccffcc"
| 2
| October 28, 19847:00p.m. CST
| L.A. Lakers
| W 107–96
| Aguirre (31)
| Vincent (10)
| Davis, Nimphuis (6)
| Reunion Arena17,007
| 1–1
|- align="center" bgcolor="#ffcccc"
| 3
| October 30, 1984
| @ Houston
| L 84–106
|
|
|
| The Summit
| 1–2
|- align="center" bgcolor="#ccffcc"
| 4
| October 31, 1984
| @ Indiana
| W 101–100
|
|
|
| Market Square Arena
| 2–2

|- align="center" bgcolor="#ffcccc"
| 5
| November 2, 1984
| @ Philadelphia
| L 103–107
|
|
|
| The Spectrum
| 2–3
|- align="center" bgcolor="#ffcccc"
| 6
| November 3, 1984
| Phoenix
| L 93–105
|
|
|
| Reunion Arena
| 2–4
|- align="center" bgcolor="#ccffcc"
| 7
| November 6, 1984
| New York
| W 107–104
|
|
|
| Reunion Arena
| 3–4
|- align="center" bgcolor="#ccffcc"
| 8
| November 8, 1984
| Atlanta
| W 112–105 (OT)
|
|
|
| Reunion Arena
| 4–4
|- align="center" bgcolor="#ccffcc"
| 9
| November 10, 1984
| Seattle
| W 106–102
|
|
|
| Reunion Arena
| 5–4
|- align="center" bgcolor="#ffcccc"
| 10
| November 12, 1984
| @ Utah
| L 97–123
|
|
|
| Salt Palace Acord Arena
| 5–5
|- align="center" bgcolor="#ccffcc"
| 11
| November 13, 1984
| @ Portland
| W 101–94
|
|
|
| Memorial Coliseum
| 6–5
|- align="center" bgcolor="#ffcccc"
| 12
| November 15, 1984
| @ Golden State
| L 112–117
|
|
|
| Oakland-Alameda County Coliseum Arena
| 6–6
|- align="center" bgcolor="#ffcccc"
| 13
| November 17, 1984
| Detroit
| L 110–124
|
|
|
| Reunion Arena
| 6–7
|- align="center" bgcolor="#ccffcc"
| 14
| November 20, 1984
| Milwaukee
| W 109–108
|
|
|
| Reunion Arena
| 7–7
|- align="center" bgcolor="#ccffcc"
| 15
| November 24, 1984
| Houston
| W 113–95
|
|
|
| Reunion Arena
| 8–7
|- align="center" bgcolor="#ffcccc"
| 16
| November 27, 1984
| Boston
| L 99–114
|
|
|
| Reunion Arena
| 8–8
|- align="center" bgcolor="#ffcccc"
| 17
| November 29, 1984
| @ San Antonio
| L 116–124
|
|
|
| HemisFair Arena
| 8–9
|- align="center" bgcolor="#ccffcc"
| 18
| November 30, 1984
| Seattle
| W 108–98
|
|
|
| Reunion Arena
| 9–9

|- align="center" bgcolor="#ffcccc"
| 19
| December 5, 1985
| L.A. Clippers
| L 106–110
|
|
|
| Reunion Arena
| 9–10
|- align="center" bgcolor="#ccffcc"
| 20
| December 6, 1984
| @ New York
| W 112–83
|
|
|
| Madison Square Garden
| 10–10
|- align="center" bgcolor="#ffcccc"
| 21
| December 8, 1984
| @ Chicago
| L 97–99
|
|
|
| Chicago Stadium
| 10–11
|- align="center" bgcolor="#ccffcc"
| 22
| December 12, 1984
| Kansas City
| W 116–107
|
|
|
| Reunion Arena
| 11–11
|- align="center" bgcolor="#ccffcc"
| 23
| December 14, 1984
| San Antonio
| W 119–102
|
|
|
| Reunion Arena
| 12–11
|- align="center" bgcolor="#ffcccc"
| 24
| December 15, 1984
| @ Houston
| L 115–117
|
|
|
| The Summit
| 12–12
|- align="center" bgcolor="#ffcccc"
| 25
| December 18, 1984
| @ Milwaukee
| L 96–110
|
|
|
| MECCA Arena
| 12–13
|- align="center" bgcolor="#ffcccc"
| 26
| December 21, 1984
| @ Denver
| L 93–116
|
|
|
| McNichols Sports Arena
| 12–14
|- align="center" bgcolor="#ccffcc"
| 27
| December 22, 1984
| @ Utah
| W 113–96
|
|
|
| Salt Palace Acord Arena
| 13–14
|- align="center" bgcolor="#ccffcc"
| 28
| December 26, 1984
| L.A. Clippers
| W 124–118
|
|
|
| Reunion Arena
| 14–14
|- align="center" bgcolor="#ccffcc"
| 29
| December 28, 1984
| @ Phoenix
| W 125–111
|
|
|
| Arizona Veterans Memorial Coliseum
| 15–14
|- align="center" bgcolor="#ffcccc"
| 30
| December 29, 1984
| Utah
| L 97–99
|
|
|
| Reunion Arena
| 15–15

|- align="center" bgcolor="#ffcccc"
| 31
| January 3, 1985
| @ San Antonio
| L 115–116
|
|
|
| HemisFair Arena
| 15–16
|- align="center" bgcolor="#ccffcc"
| 32
| January 5, 1985
| Kansas City
| W 135–107
|
|
|
| Reunion Arena
| 16–16
|- align="center" bgcolor="#ccffcc"
| 33
| January 7, 1985
| @ Seattle
| W 102–84
|
|
|
| Kingdome
| 17–16
|- align="center" bgcolor="#ccffcc"
| 34
| January 8, 1985
| @ Portland
| W 108–102
|
|
|
| Memorial Coliseum
| 18–16
|- align="center" bgcolor="#ccffcc"
| 35
| January 10, 1985
| @ Kansas City
| W 117–110 (OT)
|
|
|
| Kemper Arena
| 19–16
|- align="center" bgcolor="#ffcccc"
| 36
| January 11, 19857:30p.m. CST
| L.A. Lakers
| L 102–121
| Aguirre (28)
| Aguirre (8)
| Davis (6)
| Reunion Arena17,007
| 19–17
|- align="center" bgcolor="#ccffcc"
| 37
| January 13, 1985
| Portland
| W 124–101
|
|
|
| Reunion Arena
| 20–17
|- align="center" bgcolor="#ccffcc"
| 38
| January 15, 1985
| @ Golden State
| W 149–104
|
|
|
| Oakland-Alameda County Coliseum Arena
| 21–17
|- align="center" bgcolor="#ffcccc"
| 39
| January 16, 1985
| @ Phoenix
| L 95–98
|
|
|
| Arizona Veterans Memorial Coliseum
| 21–18
|- align="center" bgcolor="#ffcccc"
| 40
| January 18, 19859:30p.m. CST
| @ L.A. Lakers
| L 92–110
| Aguirre (22)
| Bryant, Vincent (7)
| Davis (13)
| The Forum17,505
| 21–19
|- align="center" bgcolor="#ccffcc"
| 41
| January 19, 1985
| @ L.A. Clippers
| W 101–100
|
|
|
| Los Angeles Memorial Sports Arena
| 22–19
|- align="center" bgcolor="#ccffcc"
| 42
| January 23, 1985
| San Antonio
| W 122–110
|
|
|
| Reunion Arena
| 23–19
|- align="center" bgcolor="#ffcccc"
| 43
| January 24, 1985
| @ Washington
| L 92–93
|
|
|
| Capital Centre
| 23–20
|- align="center" bgcolor="#ffcccc"
| 44
| January 26, 1985
| New Jersey
| L 93–103
|
|
|
| Reunion Arena
| 23–21
|- align="center" bgcolor="#ccffcc"
| 45
| January 28, 1985
| Philadelphia
| W 111–109
|
|
|
| Reunion Arena
| 24–21
|- align="center" bgcolor="#ffcccc"
| 46
| January 31, 1985
| @ Denver
| L 110–121
|
|
|
| McNichols Sports Arena
| 24–22

|- align="center" bgcolor="#ffcccc"
| 47
| February 1, 1985
| Utah
| L 109–121
|
|
|
| Reunion Arena
| 24–23
|- align="center" bgcolor="#ccffcc"
| 48
| February 3, 1985
| Denver
| W 114–106
|
|
|
| Reunion Arena
| 25–23
|- align="center" bgcolor="#ccffcc"
| 49
| February 5, 1985
| @ Atlanta
| W 112–103
|
|
|
| Lakefront Arena
| 26–23
|- align="center" bgcolor="#ccffcc"
| 50
| February 6, 1985
| Golden State
| W 129–103
|
|
|
| Reunion Arena
| 27–23
|- align="center"
|colspan="9" bgcolor="#bbcaff"|All-Star Break
|- style="background:#cfc;"
|- bgcolor="#bbffbb"
|- align="center" bgcolor="#ccffcc"
| 51
| February 12, 1985
| @ Cleveland
| W 131–112
|
|
|
| Richfield Coliseum
| 28–23
|- align="center" bgcolor="#ffcccc"
| 52
| February 13, 1985
| @ Detroit
| L 119–124
|
|
|
| Pontiac Silverdome
| 28–24
|- align="center" bgcolor="#ffcccc"
| 53
| February 15, 1985
| Phoenix
| L 103–126
|
|
|
| Reunion Arena
| 28–25
|- align="center" bgcolor="#ccffcc"
| 54
| February 19, 1985
| @ Houston
| W 124–115
|
|
|
| The Summit
| 29–25
|- align="center" bgcolor="#ccffcc"
| 55
| February 20, 1985
| Portland
| W 104–98
|
|
|
| Reunion Arena
| 30–25
|- align="center" bgcolor="#ccffcc"
| 56
| February 22, 1985
| Washington
| W 110–101
|
|
|
| Reunion Arena
| 31–25
|- align="center" bgcolor="#ccffcc"
| 57
| February 23, 1985
| @ Kansas City
| W 121–98
|
|
|
| Kemper Arena
| 32–25
|- align="center" bgcolor="#ffcccc"
| 58
| February 26, 1985
| Utah
| L 96–103
|
|
|
| Reunion Arena
| 32–26

|- align="center" bgcolor="#ffcccc"
| 59
| March 1, 1985
| Denver
| L 140–141 (OT)
|
|
|
| Reunion Arena
| 32–27
|- align="center" bgcolor="#ffcccc"
| 60
| March 2, 19857:30p.m. CST
| L.A. Lakers
| L 106–125
| Aguirre (33)
| Perkins (11)
| Harper (5)
| Reunion Arena17,007
| 32–28
|- align="center" bgcolor="#ccffcc"
| 61
| March 4, 1985
| @ Phoenix
| W 107–99
|
|
|
| Arizona Veterans Memorial Coliseum
| 33–28
|- align="center" bgcolor="#ccffcc"
| 62
| March 5, 1985
| Indiana
| W 108–102
|
|
|
| Reunion Arena
| 34–28
|- align="center" bgcolor="#ffcccc"
| 63
| March 8, 1985
| @ Boston
| L 122–133
|
|
|
| Boston Garden
| 34–29
|- align="center" bgcolor="#ccffcc"
| 64
| March 10, 1985
| @ New Jersey
| W 126–113
|
|
|
| Brendan Byrne Arena
| 35–29
|- align="center" bgcolor="#ccffcc"
| 65
| March 11, 1985
| Seattle
| W 103–100
|
|
|
| Reunion Arena
| 36–29
|- align="center" bgcolor="#ccffcc"
| 66
| March 13, 1985
| Kansas City
| W 118–1002
|
|
|
| Reunion Arena
| 37–29
|- align="center" bgcolor="#ccffcc"
| 67
| March 15, 1985
| Denver
| W 127–108
|
|
|
| Reunion Arena
| 38–29
|- align="center" bgcolor="#ffcccc"
| 68
| March 16, 1985
| Cleveland
| L 128–135 (OT)
|
|
|
| Reunion Arena
| 38–30
|- align="center" bgcolor="#ffcccc"
| 69
| March 18, 1985
| @ Denver
| L 111–113
|
|
|
| McNichols Sports Arena
| 38–31
|- align="center" bgcolor="#ccffcc"
| 70
| March 19, 1985
| San Antonio
| W 96–89
|
|
|
| Reunion Arena
| 39–31
|- align="center" bgcolor="#ccffcc"
| 71
| March 22, 1985
| @ San Antonio
| W 123–114
|
|
|
| HemisFair Arena
| 40–31
|- align="center" bgcolor="#ffcccc"
| 72
| March 23, 1985
| Chicago
| L 97–107
|
|
|
| Reunion Arena
| 40–32
|- align="center" bgcolor="#ccffcc"
| 73
| March 26, 1985
| Golden State
| W 134–107
|
|
|
| Reunion Arena
| 41–32
|- align="center" bgcolor="#ffcccc"
| 74
| March 27, 1985
| @ Utah
| L 101–116
|
|
|
| Salt Palace Acord Arena
| 41–33
|- align="center" bgcolor="#ffcccc"
| 75
| March 29, 19859:30p.m. CST
| @ L.A. Lakers
| L 115–120
| Aguirre (28)
| Perkins (10)
| Davis (12)
| The Forum17,505
| 41–34

|- align="center" bgcolor="#ccffcc"
| 76
| April 2, 1985
| @ Golden State
| W 127–121
|
|
|
| Oakland-Alameda County Coliseum Arena
| 42–34
|- align="center" bgcolor="#ffcccc"
| 77
| April 5, 1985
| L.A. Clippers
| L 122–126 (OT)
|
|
|
| Reunion Arena
| 42–35
|- align="center" bgcolor="#ffcccc"
| 78
| April 6, 1985
| Houston
| L 127–139 (2OT)
|
|
|
| Reunion Arena
| 42–36
|- align="center" bgcolor="#ffcccc"
| 79
| April 9, 1985
| @ Kansas City
| L 105–117
|
|
|
| Kemper Arena
| 42–37
|- align="center" bgcolor="#ccffcc"
| 80
| April 11, 1985
| @ Seattle
| W 124–80
|
|
|
| Tacoma Dome
| 43–37
|- align="center" bgcolor="#ffcccc"
| 81
| April 12, 1985
| @ Portland
| L 111–131
|
|
|
| Memorial Coliseum
| 43–38
|- align="center" bgcolor="#ccffcc"
| 82
| April 14, 1985
| @ L.A. Clippers
| W 96–92
|
|
|
| Los Angeles Memorial Sports Arena
| 44–38

Playoffs

|- align="center" bgcolor="#ccffcc"
| 1
| April 18, 1985
| Portland
| W 139–131 (2OT)
| Blackman (43)
| Aguirre (14)
| Blackman (6)
| Reunion Arena17,007
| 1–0
|- align="center" bgcolor="#ffcccc"
| 2
| April 20, 1985
| Portland
| L 121–124 (OT)
| Blackman (41)
| Perkins (19)
| Harper (8)
| Reunion Arena17,007
| 1–1
|- align="center" bgcolor="#ffcccc"
| 3
| April 23, 1985
| @ Portland
| L 109–122
| Aguirre, Blackman (30)
| Perkins, Vincent (9)
| Davis (5)
| Memorial Coliseum12,666
| 1–2
|- align="center" bgcolor="#ffcccc"
| 4
| April 25, 1985
| @ Portland
| L 113–115
| Aguirre (39)
| Perkins (10)
| Davis (8)
| Memorial Coliseum12,666
| 1–3
|-

Player statistics

Season

Playoffs

Awards and records
 Rolando Blackman, NBA All-Star Game

Transactions

References

See also
 1984-85 NBA season

Dallas Mavericks seasons
Dal
Dallas
Dallas